The Fire Bride is a 1922 American silent adventure film directed by Arthur Rosson and starring Ruth Renick, 
Edward Hearn and Walt Whitman.

Cast
 Ruth Renick as Lois Markham
 Edward Hearn as Steve Maitland
 Walt Whitman as Capt. Markham
 Fred R. Stanton as Capt. Blackton

References

Bibliography
 Robert B. Connelly. The Silents: Silent Feature Films, 1910-36, Volume 40, Issue 2. December Press, 1998.

External links
 

1922 films
1922 adventure films
American silent feature films
American adventure films
American black-and-white films
Film Booking Offices of America films
Films directed by Arthur Rosson
1920s English-language films
1920s American films
Silent adventure films